Group B of the 2015 Africa Cup of Nations was played from 18 January until 26 January in Equatorial Guinea. The group consisted of Zambia, Tunisia, Cape Verde, and DR Congo. Tunisia and DR Congo advanced as group winners and runners-up respectively, while Cape Verde and Zambia were eliminated.

Teams

Notes

Standings

In the quarter-finals:
Tunisia advanced to play Equatorial Guinea (runner-up of Group A).
DR Congo advanced to play Congo (winner of Group A).

Matches
All times local, WAT (UTC+1).

Zambia vs DR Congo
Zambia opened the scoring inside two minutes, as Chisamba Lungu controlled Robert Kidiaba's punch outside the area, allowing Given Singuluma to score with his right foot. Yannick Bolasie equalized for DR Congo in the 66th minute, as he shot home from inside the penalty area from Cedrick Mabwati's pass.

Tunisia vs Cape Verde
Tunisia opened the scoring in the 70th minute, as Ali Maâloul's cross was converted by Mohamed Ali Manser at the far post. Cape Verde equalized eight minutes later through Héldon's penalty after he was brought down by Syam Ben Youssef at the edge of the penalty area.

Zambia vs Tunisia
Zambia took the lead in the 60th minute, when Emmanuel Mayuka scored home from Rainford Kalaba's lofted pass. Tunisia equalized ten minutes later after Syam Ben Youssef flicked a corner to Ahmed Akaïchi to score from close range. They completed the comeback in the 89th minute, as Yassine Chikhaoui headed in Youssef Msakni's cross.

Cape Verde vs DR Congo
Both teams played to their second consecutive draw. DR Congo lost their captain Youssouf Mulumbu to injury in the first half. Cape Verde had chances to win at the end of the match, but had their shots saved by opposing goalkeeper Robert Kidiaba.

Cape Verde vs Zambia
In a match played under torrential rain, both teams could not find the net, and the goalless draw meant both teams were eliminated from the tournament.

DR Congo vs Tunisia
Tunisia took the lead in the 31st minute, as Yassine Chikhaoui's shot was deflected and Ahmed Akaïchi headed the ball in. DR Congo equalized in the 66th minute, after Dieumerci Mbokani headed down a long ball for Jeremy Bokila to score. The result was enough for Tunisia to win the group, while DR Congo also qualified as runners-up, ahead of Cape Verde on goals scored.

References

External links
Orange Africa Cup Of Nations, Equatorial Guinea 2015, CAFonline.com

Group B
Africa